The Duchy of Bouillon was a duchy comprising Bouillon and adjacent towns and villages in present-day Belgium.

The state originated in the 10th century as property of the Lords of Bouillon, owners of Bouillon Castle. Crusader Godfrey of Bouillon, later the first King of Jerusalem, sold Bouillon to the Prince-Bishopric of Liège, in 1095. The Prince-Bishops of Liège consequently became lords of Bouillon and eventually adopted the title of duke. The duchy was later claimed by members of the Houses of La Marck and La Tour d'Auvergne. From 1678, it was a sovereign duchy under French protection and ruled by La Tour. It was annexed by France in 1795.

Geography

The Duchy of Bouillon was a sovereign duchy until 1795. In 1789, it had a population of 2,500.  The largest town was Bouillon, situated on the Semois.  It also consisted of the surrounding villages: Sugny, Corbion, Alle, Rochehaut, Ucimont, Botassart, Sensenruth, Noirefontaine, Gros-Fays, Fays-les-Veneurs, Bertrix, Carlsbourg, Paliseul, Jehonville, Opont, Anloy, Porcheresse, Gembes, Gedinne, Sart-Custinne, and Tellin.

Bouillon is located in a Walloon-speaking region.

History

The Duchy of Bouillon's origins are unclear.  The first reference to Bouillon Castle comes in 988 and by the 11th century, Bouillon was a freehold held by the House of Ardennes, who styled themselves Lords of Bouillon.  On the death of Godfrey III, Duke of Lower Lorraine in 1069, Bouillon passed to his nephew, Godfrey of Bouillon. In 1095, Godfrey of Bouillon sold Bouillon to Otbert, the Prince-Bishop of Liège, in order to finance his participation in the First Crusade. Godfrey later became first ruler of the Kingdom of Jerusalem.

The Prince-Bishop of Liège granted the châtellenie of Bouillon to the House of La Marck in 1415.  In 1456, Louis de Bourbon, Bishop of Liège became the first individual to style himself "Duke of Bouillon".  In 1482, the then Châtelain of Bouillon, William de La Marck, ordered the assassination of Louis in a plot to install his son, Jean de la Marck, as Prince-Bishop.  This plot proved unsuccessful: John of Hornes was elected as successor of Louis de Bourbon as Prince-Bishop of Liège.  John then fought a war with William that ended with the Treaty of Tongeren, signed May 21, 1484, with the de la Marck family relinquishing its claim on Liège, though they retained Bouillon Castle as a pledge for a loan of 30,000 livres and for their support for the Prince-Bishop against the emperor Maximilian I.  In 1492 Robert II de la Marck began calling himself "Duke of Bouillon", but in 1521, Érard de La Marck, Prince-Bishop of Liège (and Robert's brother), with the backing of the troops of Charles V, Holy Roman Emperor, managed to regain Bouillon for the Prince-Bishopric.

On becoming chatelain in 1536 Robert Fleuranges III de La Marck also  styled himself "Duke of Bouillon" and his successor Robert IV maintained the right to this title.  During the Italian War of 1551–1559, Bouillon was occupied by the forces of Henry II of France to keep them free from Habsburg influence, but Henry confirmed Robert IV as Duke of Bouillon.

From 1560 to 1642, the Dukes of Bouillon were also the rulers of the independent Principality of Sedan.

With the death of Charlotte de La Marck in 1594, the duchy and the title passed to her husband Henri de La Tour d'Auvergne and thereafter became the possession of the House of La Tour d'Auvergne.  France again invaded Bouillon in 1676 during the Franco-Dutch War, but Godefroy Maurice de La Tour d'Auvergne retained the title.  From this point on, although the Duchy of Bouillon was officially still a part of the Holy Roman Empire, it was in actuality a French protectorate.  This state of affairs was confirmed by the 1678 Treaties of Nijmegen.

In the wake of the French Revolution, the French Revolutionary Army invaded the Duchy of Bouillon in 1794, creating the short-lived Republic of Bouillon. In 1795, Bouillon was annexed to France.  The last duke, Jacques Léopold de La Tour d'Auvergne, died in 1802 without any children (which was the extinction of the La Tour d'Auvergne family).

In 1815 the Congress of Vienna established an arbitral commission to determine the "Duke of Bouillon" and decided in favor of Charles Alain Gabriel de Rohan (the last duke's closest relative on his paternal side) over Philippe d'Auvergne (a postulated relative, who had been adopted and declared an heir by Jacques' father, Godefroy de La Tour d'Auvergne, when he was the duke). Meanwhile the Duchy of Bouillon was annexed to the Grand Duchy of Luxembourg, then in personal union with the Kingdom of the Netherlands (later becoming part of the Kingdom of the Belgians in 1830). The title, territory and the debt of Bouillon remained a bone of contention between the bishopric and the noble houses before and after the French annexation of Bouillon in 1795. Court rulings about claimants were not resolved until 1825.

List of Dukes of Bouillon

Prince Bishops of Liege 1456–?

House of La Marck, ?–1588

House of La Tour d'Auvergne, 1588–1802

House of Rohan, 1816–1975 
In 1816, the Congress of Vienna restored the title of "Duke of Bouillon", giving it to Charles Alain Gabriel de Rohan, grandson of Marie Louise de La Tour d'Auvergne, who was the daughter of the former duke Charles Godefroy de La Tour d'Auvergne. In 1918 Austria became a republic so the ducal titles ceased to exist.

Bibliography  
 Jacques Marsollier (1647-1724): Histoire du maréchal duc de Bouillon; où l'on trouve ce qui s'est passé de plus remarquable sous les regnes de François II, Charles IX, Henry III, Henry IV, la minorité & les premières années du regne de Louis XIII 
 Vol I (1726), online 
 Vol II (1726), online
 Vol III (1726), online

See also

 Duchess of Bouillon
 Prince of Sedan

Notes

 
House of La Marck
La Tour d'Auvergne
House of Rohan
Duke of Bouillon
Duchies of the Holy Roman Empire
Duchy of Bouillon
Duchy of Bouillon
Southern Netherlands